Janou Saint-Denis (born 6 May 1930 in Montreal – died 11 May 2000) was a Québécoise poet, essayist, actress and director.

Biography

Janou Saint-Denis was born in Montreal and studied theatre at the LaSalle Conservatory and the Théâtre du Nouveau Monde workshop. In addition to theatrical productions, she worked on radio and television, including the programme .

Saint-Denis founded the théâtre Les Satellites de Montréal in 1957 and produced works of Quebec playwrights including Claude Gauvreau and Félix Leclerc.  In 1959 the theatre opened for its first public readings of poetry. In 1961 Saint-Denis received the National Award for Best Supporting Actress.

Saint-Denis left for Paris in 1961 where she remained for a decade, establishing a network of Quebec and French poets.  Returning to Montreal, she founded Éditions du Soudain to hold poetry shows, notably the event Place aux Poètes held on Wednesdays starting on 5 February 1975. Saint-Denis organized and hosted this event for 26 years, held in various businesses located generally on St-Denis Street in Montreal.  She also organized and hosted quatre Nuits de la poésie and co-hosted, with Michel Garneau, the National Film Board Poetry Night.

Saint-Denis published numerous poems and texts in literary magazines including: l'Atelier littéraire de la Mauricie (Trois-Rivières), Sorcières (Paris), Femmes plurielle (Ottawa), Moebius and Les Cahiers de la femme (Toronto), Canton s’met à faire de la poésie (Sherbrooke), Cahiers des arts visuels and Arcade. She was an honorary member of the Union of Quebec Writers.

The archives of Janou Saint-Denis are preserved in the Montreal archives centre of the Bibliothèque et Archives nationales du Québec (BAnQ).

Bibliography

Les Carnets de l'Audace
1: 
2: 
3:

References

External links
Janou Saint-Denis on the website of l'Infocentre littéraire des écrivains québécois. 

1930 births
2000 deaths
French Quebecers
Canadian women poets
Writers from Montreal
19th-century Canadian essayists
19th-century Canadian poets
Burials at Notre Dame des Neiges Cemetery